Hi-Life is a 1998 American Christmas romantic comedy film written and directed by Roger Hedden and starring Katrin Cartlidge, Charles Durning, Daryl Hannah, Moira Kelly, Peter Riegert, Campbell Scott and Eric Stoltz.

Cast
Katrin Cartlidge as April
Charles Durning as Fatty
Daryl Hannah as Maggie
Moira Kelly as Susan
Peter Riegert as Minor
Campbell Scott as Ray
Eric Stoltz as Jimmy
Anne De Salvo as Sherry
Saundra Santiago as Elena
Bruce MacVittie as Cluck
Tegan West as Phil
Carlo Alban as Ricky

Reception
The film has an 83% rating on Rotten Tomatoes.

References

External links
 
 

Lionsgate films
American romantic comedy films
American Christmas films
1990s English-language films
1990s American films